Anhad Jawanda (Hindi: अनहद जवानदा) is an Indian Shooter. He is from Ludhiana Punjab who competes in the 10 meter air pistol, 25 meter rapid fire pistol, 25 meter pistol, and  25 meter standard pistol events. Anhad has been a part of the Indian Shooting Team since 2015. He has represented India at the ISSF Junior World Cup 2016(Gabala), ISSF Junior World Championship 2017(Suhl) and the ISSF Junior World Cup 2018(Sydney)

Career
In ISSF Junior World Championships, Anhad won one gold medal in 25m Pistol, one silver 25m Standard Pistol and one bronze in Rapid Fire Pistol for India.
Anhad Jawanda won two Gold Medals in 25m Sports Pistol Jr Men Event at ISSF Junior World Cup 2016, Gabala.
Anahad Jawanda also won the 25-metre sports pistol gold in the 27th Meeting of Shooting Hopes 2017 international junior competition, Plzen, Czech Republic.

References

External links
 Profile at ISSF

Living people
1998 births
People from Chandigarh